Mokřiny (German: Nassengrub) is a village in Karlovy Vary Region, Czech Republic, and the second most populous town district of Aš. In 2001 the village had a population of 530.

Geography 
Mokřiny is located to the south from Aš; unlike other town districts, it forms a continuous populated area with it. To the east it neighbours with Vernéřov, to the south with Nový Žďár, and to the southeast with Nebesa. To the west is the German border.

History 
Mokřiny was established by the Zedtwitz, before 1413, when it is first mentioned. In 1874 Mokřiny became a separate municipality. In 1971 it was joined with Aš.

Landmarks 
 Catholic church of St. Charles Borromeo from 1912,
 Protestant church from 1913 (from architect Otto Bartning),
 World War I Memorial from 1924.

Notable residents
 Karl Fritzsch (1903–1945), Nazi SS Auschwitz concentration camp commandant who was the first to use Zyklon B for mass murder

Gallery

References 

Aš
Villages in Cheb District